This list of 1954 motorsport champions is a list of national or international auto racing series with a Championship decided by the points or positions earned by a driver from multiple races.

Formula cars

Sports car

Stock car racing

Motorcycle

See also
 List of motorsport championships
 Auto racing

1954 in motorsport
1954